The 1944–45 İstanbul Football League season was the 37th season of the league. Beşiktaş JK won the league for the 8th time.

Season

References

Istanbul Football League seasons
Turkey
2